My Son, My Son is a British television drama series which first aired on BBC 1 between 18 March and 6 May 1979. It is an adaptation of the 1938 novel of the same title by Howard Spring.

Selected cast
 Michael Williams as  William Essex
 Frank Grimes as Dermot O'Riorden
 Kate Binchy as Sheila O'Riorden
 Patsy Rowlands as Annie Suthurst
 Patrick Ryecart as Oliver Essex
 Ciaran Madden as Livia Vaynol
 Prue Clarke as  Maeve O'Riorden 
 Gerard Murphy as  Rory O'Riorden
 Maurice Denham as  Captain Judas
 Angela Harding as Maggie Donnelly
 Grégoire Aslan as Josef Wertheim
 Julian Fellowes as  Pogson
 Matthew Long as Sawle
 Neale Goodrum as  Martin
 Alan MacNaughtan as Sir Charles Blatch
 Patrick Waldron as  Kevin Donnelly
 Sherrie Hewson as Nellie Essex 
 Joy Nichols as Josie Wertheim
 Elizabeth Seal as  Mary Latter
 Derek Fowlds as  Newbiggen
 Cyril Luckham as  Reverend Oliver
 Ivor Salter as Summerways
 Willoughby Goddard as Mr. Moscrop
 Joyce Carey as Mrs. Bendall

References

Bibliography
Ellen Baskin. Serials on British Television, 1950-1994. Scolar Press, 1996.

External links
 

BBC television dramas
1979 British television series debuts
1979 British television series endings
1970s British drama television series
1970s British television miniseries
English-language television shows
Television shows based on British novels